The 49th Golden Globe Awards, honoring the best in film and television for 1991, were held on January 18, 1992 at the Beverly Hilton. The nominations were announced on December 27, 1991.

Winners and nominees

Film 

The following films received multiple nominations:

The following films received multiple wins:

Television 
The following programs received multiple nominations:

The following films and programs received multiple wins:

Ceremony

Presenters 

 Kathy Bates
 Corbin Bernsen
 Michael Caine
 Bruce Davison
 Shannen Doherty
 Charles Durning
 Valeria Golino
 John Goodman
 Jeremy Irons
 Piper Laurie
 Jennifer Jason Leigh
 Kyle MacLachlan
 Kate Nelligan
 Luke Perry
 Jason Priestley
 Aidan Quinn
 Mimi Rogers
 Jane Russell
 Arnold Schwarzenegger
 Patricia Wettig
 Rutger Hauer

Cecil B. DeMille Award 
Robert Mitchum

Miss Golden Globe 
Joely Fisher (daughter of Connie Fisher & Eddie Fisher)

Awards breakdown 
The following networks received multiple nominations:

The following networks received multiple wins:

See also
 64th Academy Awards
 12th Golden Raspberry Awards
 43rd Primetime Emmy Awards
 44th Primetime Emmy Awards
 45th British Academy Film Awards
 46th Tony Awards
 1991 in film
 1991 in American television

References

049
1991 film awards
1991 television awards
January 1992 events in the United States
Golden